The Colorado Avalanche are an American professional ice hockey team based in Denver, Colorado. They play in the Central Division of the Western Conference in the National Hockey League (NHL). The team joined the NHL in 1972 as a charter member of the World Hockey Association, and were named the Quebec Nordiques, but moved to Denver in 1995. The Avalanche won their first Stanley Cup championship in 1996, and won another one in 2001. Having first played at the McNichols Sports Arena, the Avalanche have played their home games at Pepsi Center since 1999. The Avalanche are owned by Ann Walton Kroenke, their general manager is  Chris MacFarland, and Gabriel Landeskog is the team captain.

There have been seven head coaches for the Avalanche team. The team's first head coach was Marc Crawford, who coached for three seasons. Bob Hartley is the team's all-time leader for the most regular-season games coached (359), the most regular-season game wins (193), the most regular-season points (444), the most playoff games coached (80), and the most playoff-game wins (49). Crawford and Hartley are the only head coaches to have won the Stanley Cup with the Avalanche, in the 1996 Stanley Cup Finals and the 2001 Stanley Cup Finals respectively. None of the Avalanche head coaches have been elected into the Hockey Hall of Fame as a builder. Tony Granato, who coached two terms with the Avalanche, has spent his entire NHL head coaching career with the Avalanche. Granato was fired after the 2008–09 season.

On June 4, 2009, the Avalanche hired Joe Sacco, the coach of their AHL affiliate The Lake Erie Monsters, as the new head coach to succeed Granato. Following the 2012–13 season, his fourth year at the helm, finishing last in the Western Conference and out of the playoffs for a third consecutive year, Sacco was relieved of his duties on April 28, 2013.

A month later, former Avalanche goalie Patrick Roy was introduced as the team's latest head coach on May 28, 2013. On August 11, 2016, Roy announced that he had resigned as head coach of the Avalanche.

On August 25, 2016, Jared Bednar was announced as the seventh head coach in Avalanche history.

Key

Coaches

Note: Statistics are correct through the 2021–22 season.

See also
List of NHL head coaches
List of Quebec Nordiques head coaches

Notes
 A running total of the number of coaches of the Avalanche. Thus, any coach who has two or more separate terms as head coach is only counted once.
 Before the 2005–06 season, the NHL instituted a penalty shootout for regular season games that remained tied after a five-minute overtime period, which prevented ties.
Each year is linked to an article about that particular NHL season.

References

Colorado Avalanche coaches
Colorado Avalanche head coaches
Head coaches